Vali Kandi (also Romanized as Valī Kandī; also known as Qeshlaq-e-Vālī, Vali Kans, Vālī Qeshlāq, and Vali Qishlāq) is a village in Chaybasar-e Shomali Rural District, Bazargan District, Maku County, West Azerbaijan Province, Iran. At the 2006 census, its population was 426, in 63 families.

References 

Populated places in Maku County